The 2011 Volkswagen Scirocco R-Cup season was the second Volkswagen Scirocco R-Cup season, the replacement for the ADAC Volkswagen Polo Cup. It began on 30 April at the Hockenheimring and concluded at the same venue on 22 October, after eight race weekends and a total of ten races.

Drivers
 All cars are powered by Volkswagen engines and use Volkswagen Scirocco chassis.

Race calendar and results

Championship standings
Scoring system

 In order to not disadvantage new drivers to the series, half-points are awarded at the opening two races of the season.

Drivers' Championship

Junior Cup

References

External links
Official website

Volkswagen Scirocco R-Cup
Volkswagen Scirocco R-Cup seasons